= Institute for Trafficked, Exploited, and Missing Persons =

International organization

The Institute for Trafficked, Exploited, and Missing Persons (ITEMP) provides services to victims of forced labor, sexual exploitation, and other forms of modern-day slavery in Guatemala. Local authorities work with La Asociación Nuestros Ahijados in the rescue process, and rely on ITEMP to provide short- and long-term rehabilitation for rescued victims. ITEMP is unique in Guatemala, because the program works with adults as well as children. ITEMP fights trafficking and exploitation in three distinct ways: through rescue, rehabilitation, and public education. The project also focuses on prevention through public awareness and education, as well as by hosting the annual Guatemalan National Trafficking in Persons Congress.

== Activities ==
ITEMP aggressively seeks custody of children being trafficked and/or exploited. The project also provides short- and long-term housing for all victims, through host families for minors, and shelter for adult victims. The rehabilitation process works to provide the tools for a better life. Counseling and education are made available for children, as well as technical and vocational training for adults. ITEMP also works to educate the people of Guatemala and the U.S. about trafficking and the terrible atrocities faced by exploited persons, and the resources available to help those who need it.

== Goals ==
Victims of trafficking and exploitation are coerced through fear tactics, violence, and a lack of knowledge of the resources available to them. Rescue is only the first step. The goals of ITEMP are: protection, prevention, and, on a smaller scale, prosecution. Many of those rescued are at a very high risk of falling victim to trafficking or exploitation again. Long-term rehabilitation, including education and counseling, provides tools to resist being victimized in the future and requires significant funding to ensure its success. ITEMP and Nuestros Ahijados are dedicated to the complete rehabilitation of rescued persons regardless of the amount of time it takes. Children that enter the program at the age of six or seven will be taken through the program until the completion of their education, sometimes all the way through medical or law school.

== Community cooperation ==
ITEMP provides counseling and legal services to work with victims in the hopes of increasing prosecution of traffickers in Guatemala.

ITEMP works with other programs/NGOs, as well as the Guatemalan government to better aid victims and increase prosecution of offenders. In 2008, the project hosted the first annual Guatemalan National Trafficking in Persons Congress In 2011, the institute (ITEMP) conducted a statistical study that connects poverty and human trafficking.
